The 1961 World 600, the second running of the event, was a NASCAR Grand National Series event that took place on May 28, 1961, at Charlotte Motor Speedway in Concord, North Carolina. Chris Economaki called the race in one of the few televised NASCAR races of the 1960s. A series of two qualifying events took place on May 21 to determine the starting grid for this event.

This race began a streak of 1856 consecutive NASCAR races where at least one of the drivers in the race was from North Carolina. The streak would come to an end after Dale Earnhardt Jr. did not race in the 2012 Bank of America 500 at Charlotte after getting a concussion after the previous race at Talladega.

Background
Charlotte Motor Speedway, a  quad-oval track located in Concord, North Carolina, was the location for the race. The track's turns were banked at twenty-four degrees, while the front stretch, the location of the finish line, was five degrees. The back stretch, opposite of the front, also had a five degree banking. Charlotte Motor Speedway hosted the NASCAR Grand National Series twice during the season, with the other race being the National 400. The track opened for the inaugural World 600 one year earlier, and was built by Bruton Smith and Curtis Turner. Around 46,538 spectators attended the race.

Race report
Four hundred laps were raced over a paved oval track spanning  with a time of five hours, twenty-two minutes, and twenty-nine seconds. Seven cautions were waved for fifty-seven laps. David Pearson defeated Fireball Roberts by more than two laps for his first NASCAR Cup series victory. Even though there were 55 cars in the event, only 19 vehicles were allowed to qualify during each pre-race qualifying session.

The qualifying races only set the front row (which is the opposite of what happens before the Daytona 500). A lot of drivers chose not to participate in qualifying.

Attendance for this race was 46,538 and the top prize was $24,280 ($ when adjusted for inflation). The last place competitor received $200 ($ when adjusted for inflation). Competitors for this race included: Ralph Earnhardt, Ned Jarrett, Tiny Lund, Junior Johnson, Joe Weatherly, Richard Petty, and Roy Tyner. Ralph Earnhardt was competitive early, leading four times and finishing 11th.

A terrible crash occurred to driver Reds Kagle; he would lose a leg in this race when his car penetrated the outside guard rail.

Notable crew chiefs for the race were Ray Fox, Bud Allman, Smokey Yunick, Mario Rossi, Roy Burdick, Shorty Johns and Joseph Meyer.

Qualifying

Finishing order
Section reference:

Timeline
Section reference: 
 Start: Joe Weatherly was leading the pack as the cars officially crossed the start/finish line.
 Lap 2: David Pearson took over the lead from Joe Weatherly.
 Lap 3: Joe Weatherly took over the lead from David Pearson; E.J. Trivette's vehicle suddenly developed problems with its axle.
 Lap 6: Doug Cox fell out with engine failure.
 Lap 10: The timing on Larry Frank's vehicle became abnormal.
 Lap 16: Ralph Earnhardt took over the lead from Joe Weatherly.
 Lap 34: Jack Smith took over the lead from Ralph Earnhardt.
 Lap 37: Ralph Earnhardt took over the lead from Jack Smith.
 Lap 40: Joe Lee Johnson inflicted terminal vehicle damage.
 Lap 49: David Pearson took over the lead from Ralph Earnhardt.
 Lap 53: Ralph Earnhardt took over the lead from David Pearson; the axle on Bobby Allison's vehicle developed problems.
 Lap 70: David Pearson took over the lead from Ralph Earnhardt; the clutch on Roscoe Thompson's vehicle started acting abnormally.
 Lap 81: Ned Jarrett took over the lead from David Pearson.
 Lap 93: The valve spring on Jim Reed's vehicle started acting strangely.
 Lap 95: The oil pressure on Gene Stokes' vehicle suddenly became abnormal.
 Lap 111: Ralph Earnhardt took over the lead from Ned Jarrett.
 Lap 113: Axle problems took Jimmy Thompson out of the race.
 Lap 128: Problems with the vehicle's bearing took Nelson Stacy out of the race.
 Lap 136: Marvin Porter fell out with engine failure.
 Lap 139: David Pearson took over the lead from Ralph Earnhardt; Curtis Turner inflicted terminal vehicle damage.
 Lap 140: Marvin Panch inflicted terminal vehicle damage.
 Lap 147: Buck Baker managed to overheat his vehicle.
 Lap 178: Richard Petty took over the lead from David Pearson.
 Lap 201: Fireball Roberts took over the lead from Richard Petty.
 Lap 207: David Pearson took over the lead from Fireball Roberts.
 Lap 248: Richard Petty took over the lead from David Pearson.
 Lap 254: Ed Livingston managed to overheat his vehicle.
 Lap 255: Tim Flock managed to overheat his vehicle.
 Lap 272: David Pearson took over the lead from Richard Petty.
 Lap 277: Reds Kagle inflicted terminal vehicle damage.
 Lap 283: The rear end of Johnny Allen's vehicle became dangerously loose.
 Lap 291: Bob Barron was disqualified from the race by the virtue of the black flag.
 Lap 332: Richard Petty fell out with engine failure.
 Lap 336: Tubby Gonzales's vehicle developed a dangerously loose rear end; Banjo Matthews fell out with engine failure.
 Lap 338: Bob Burdick fell out with engine failure.
 Lap 342: The rear end of Buddy Baker's vehicle became dangerously loose.
 Finish: David Pearson was officially declared the winner of the event.

References

World 600
World 600
NASCAR races at Charlotte Motor Speedway
World 600